Imran Hasan Khan (born 26 January 1983) is an Indian shooter from Bareilly, Uttar Pradesh. He won a gold medal at the 2010 Commonwealth Games in Delhi, combining with Gagan Narang to win the pairs 50-metre rifle event. A member of the Indian Army, he has also won medals at the South Asian Games, as well as a bronze medal at the 2006 Asian Games in Doha, in the men's 50-metre rifle three positions team event. He also won Olympic quota place in 2012.

He has won a total of 28 International medals and 66 National medals in Men's 10m Air Rifle and Men's 50m 3 Position and holds a national record in Men's 3 Position (Big Bore).

References
 ISSF Profile

External links 

 Arsh Shooting Sports Club - https://instagram.com/arshshootingsportclub

Indian male sport shooters
Living people
Commonwealth Games gold medallists for India
Shooters at the 2010 Commonwealth Games
Indian Army personnel
People from Bareilly
Sport shooters from Uttar Pradesh
Asian Games medalists in shooting
Shooters at the 2006 Asian Games
Shooters at the 2010 Asian Games
1983 births
Commonwealth Games medallists in shooting
Asian Games bronze medalists for India
Medalists at the 2006 Asian Games
21st-century Indian people
Medallists at the 2010 Commonwealth Games